Krister Dreyer (born 11 September 1974 in Sandefjord, Norway), commonly known as Morfeus, is a Norwegian musician, singer, songwriter and multi-instrumentalist.

Morfeus is noted for his work in several bands in Norway, including Mayhem, Limbonic Art, Dimension F3H and Viper Solfa.

Discography

With Limbonic Art 
 Promo Rehearsal '95 (Demo) (1995)
 Promo 1996 (Demo) (1996)
 Moon in the Scorpio (1996)
In Abhorrence Dementia (1997)
 Epitome of Illusions (1998)
Ad Noctum - Dynasty of Death (1999)
 The Ultimate Death Worship	 (2002)
Legacy of Evil (2007)

With Dimension F3H 
(as Mr. Morfeus):
 The 3rd Generation Armageddon (Demo) (2000)
 A Presentation of Armageddon (EP) (2002)
 Reaping the World Winds (2003)
 Does the Pain Excite You? (2007)

With Viper Solfa 
(as Morfeus):
Carving an Icon (2015)

As a guest or session musician 
 Ad Inferna. In Opus 7: Elevation (2014), song "InVisible"
 Ad Inferna. In L'Empire des Sens (2001), song "The Vampyrik Supremacy"
 Aeon Winds. In And Night Shall Have Dominion (EP)	 (2014)
 Dark Fortress. In Profane Genocidal Creations (2003)
 Finnugor: In Darkness Needs Us (2004)
 Immemoreal. In Towards 1347 (Demo) (1999)
 Immemoreal: In Temple of Retribution (2001)
 Megaera: In Irrlycht / Megaera (Split) (2009)
 Octavia Sperati: In Grace Submerged (2007), keyboards and piano in "Don't Believe a Word", samples in "Submerged"

External links 
Viper Solfa Profile
Metallum Archvies
Discogs.com

1974 births
Black metal singers
Living people
Norwegian singer-songwriters
Musicians from Sandefjord
Norwegian heavy metal guitarists
Norwegian heavy metal singers
Norwegian multi-instrumentalists
Norwegian rock guitarists
Norwegian rock singers
Norwegian songwriters
21st-century Norwegian singers
21st-century Norwegian guitarists
21st-century Norwegian male singers
Mayhem (band) members